Wang OFFICE was the umbrella brand name for several suites of office automation software sold by Wang Labs in the 1980s and early 1990s.  

The VS OFFICE suite provided Email, calendar and scheduling, bulletin board, and InfoCard (contact management) services, hosted on Wang VS minicomputers and with a user interface that ran on Wang's block-mode terminals.  A character terminal "Traveling User" gateway using the Telnet protocol was also available.  Multiple hosts could be connected via a network, sharing a common directory that was "synchronized" across hosts in an early example of replication.  Email and scheduling data was also transmitted between hosts across the network.  SMTP and X.400 gateways were available for email interoperability.

Additional suites sold under the Wang OFFICE brand included "PC OFFICE" for MS-DOS based computers, and "OIS OFFICE" and "Alliance OFFICE" for proprietary multi-user systems sold by Wang under the corresponding brand names "OIS" and "Alliance".

Office suites
Email systems